Sufetula sacchari is a moth in the family Crambidae. It was described by Francisco Seín Jr. in 1930. It is found in Puerto Rico.

There are multiple generations per year.

Larvae have been recorded feeding on the roots of sugarcane, both above and below ground. Young larvae make holes in the tender roots or may tunnel in the cortex of mature roots. Older larvae feed by tunneling in the tips of the tender roots, but live in the soil cavities. They appear to migrate from one plant to another. Pupation takes place below the ground.

References

Moths described in 1930
Spilomelinae